The Children (Equal Protection from assault) (Scotland) Act 2019  was an Act of the Scottish Parliament that outlaws the use of corporal punishment on children.

Legal effect 
Pre the Act's passage all physical attacks on adults could be treated as assault under Scots Law, however, a person accused of assaulting a child could claim the defence of "reasonable chastisement" or "justifiable assault" when they had used physical force as a form of discipline on an individual under the age of 16. The act abolishes this defence, meaning parents and carers could face prosecution for any use of physical punishment on children.

Political debate 
The bill was lodged by the Scottish Green party MSP John Finnie who argued that it would "send a strong message that violence is never acceptable in any setting". The rule change won the support of his party as well as the SNP, Labour and Lib Dems. Outside of politics the act was praised by the Children and Young People's Commissioner for Scotland and various children's charities.

The bill was opposed by the Conservatives with higher education spokesperson in the Scottish Parliament, Oliver Mundell arguing that “These concerns about criminalisation have been dismissed throughout the passage of this bill but the truth is no one here can guarantee how this bill will be implemented and interpreted by the police, prosecutors or our courts.”

Timeline 
The ban was passed by the Scottish Parliament on 3 October 2019 and came into force on 7 November 2020. At the time of its introduction, Scotland was the only part of the UK to have entirely outlawed all use of corporal punishment on minors but a similar law came into force in Wales in 2022.

References 

Acts of the Scottish Parliament 2019
2019 in Scotland